Miramar Reservoir is a reservoir located in the Scripps Miramar Ranch community of San Diego, California. Owned, operated and maintained by the City of San Diego, the reservoir and its 165-foot tall earthen embankment dam were completed in 1960 as part of the second San Diego Aqueduct project. Water flowing south to the reservoir originates from both the Colorado River Aqueduct and the California Aqueduct, brought into San Diego by the San Diego County Water Authority.

The Miramar Reservoir is also a popular recreation site known as Lake Miramar or Miramar Lake to local residents. Activities include boating, fishing, picnicking, and the use of an over 5-mile-long trail wrapping around the lake. The stretch of the trail over the dam was fenced off for security reasons after the September 11, 2001 attacks, and reopened in 2007. This scenic stretch provides panoramic views of Mira Mesa, Miramar, University City, and other northern San Diego communities.

Miramar Water Treatment Plant
The Miramar Water Treatment Plant was completed in 1962. Approximately 500,000 customers in the northern section of the City are served by the Miramar Reservoir. An upgrade and expansion project to the Miramar Water Treatment Plant began in summer 1998 with construction starting in May 2001. The project was completed in 2011. The project includes chlorine and ozone disinfection facilities.

See also 
 List of lakes in California

References

External links 
 Miramar Reservoir - City of San Diego web site

Reservoirs in San Diego County, California
Reservoirs in California
Reservoirs in Southern California